Radio del Principado de Asturias is RTPA's principal radio station broadcasting generalist programs. RPA started broadcasting in 2006, and regularly on 21 December 2007.

Programs
Nowadays RPA broadcasts news at 14:30, news bulletins every hour, and football matches from the main teams of the region.

RPA publishes three different magazines.

Frequencies
RPA broadcasts in FM for all Asturias.

References

External links
RTPA website

Asturias
Radio stations in Spain
Radiotelevisión del Principado de Asturias